Wolcott House may refer to:

in the United States
(by state then city)
Oliver Wolcott House, Litchfield, Connecticut, listed on the NRHP in Litchfield County
Wolcott House (Wolcott, Indiana), formerly listed on the NRHP
Frank D. Wolcott House, Hutchinson, Kansas, listed on the NRHP in Reno County
Wolcott House (Mission Hills, Kansas), listed on the NRHP in Johnson County
Benajah Wolcott House, Lakeside-Marblehead, Ohio, listed on the NRHP in Ottawa County
Hull-Wolcott House, Maumee, Ohio, listed on the NRHP in Lucas County
Wolcott House (Northfield, Ohio), listed on the NRHP in Summit County

See also
Wolcott Historic District (disambiguation)